Mediaweek is an online trade website serving the Australian media industry. It provides news regarding the Australian newspaper, television, radio, magazine and outdoor advertising industries.

It was until the end of 2017 a weekly printed trade magazine, and for some time around 2015 issued a weekday email digest (Mediaweek Morning Report).

History and profile

Mediaweek was founded by Philip Luker, an Australian publisher, in 1990, and was later expanded to cover Entertainment Media industries.

Regular content includes Person of the Week, Inside News Brands, Inside Radio, Inside Magazines, Inside Digital, Inside Television, and Inside Subscription TV. The weekly magazine also has a spread of photos from various media events from the week, and a column called Media People, which highlights the biggest movements in the industry. Other than this, the title carries radio ratings eight times a year, and magazine and newspaper readership and circulation figures twice a year.

The current editor and publisher is James Manning, who took over the post in 1999.

Mediaweek ceased printing its magazine at the end of 2017, transitioning to a digital-only publication.

Television program

James Manning co-hosted a weekly television program titled Mediaweek on the Sky News Business Channel (later Your Money) on Thursday afternoons, which features media industry news, conducts interviews with media executives as well as stock performances of media companies. Manning co-hosted the show with a rotating presenter from the Sky News Business Channel, including Bridie Barry and Nadine Blayney. The program ran from 2009 until 16 May 2019, ending with the closure of the Your Money channel.

References

External links

1990 establishments in Australia
Magazines established in 1990
Professional and trade magazines
Magazines about the media
Weekly magazines published in Australia